John O'Dowd (13 February 1856 – 26 October 1937) was Irish Nationalist Member of Parliament for North Sligo, March–September 1900, and for South Sligo, 1900–18.

Life
He was born in Tubbercurry, Co. Sligo but emigrated to the US at an early age, returning in the later 1870s to Bunninadden, Sligo, where he was a farmer and lived for the rest of his life.  He was connected with Irish political movements from 1880 onwards and in 1881-82 was imprisoned as a ‘suspect’ under the then coercion legislation.

He was a veteran of the Land League and active in the United Irish League.  He was associated with the Irish Republican Brotherhood after his return from the US.  For many years he was chairman of Sligo County Council and his son later became accountant to the Council.

He was elected unopposed to represent North Sligo on 7 March 1900 following the resignation of Bernard Collery, and transferred unopposed to his native South Sligo constituency at the general election later that year.  He held this seat unopposed through successive general elections until December 1918, when he was defeated by the Sinn Féin candidate Alexander McCabe by 9,113 votes to 1,988.  O’Dowd had made representations on McCabe's behalf when the latter had been tried, and acquitted, for possession of explosives.
Maume (1999) states that O’Dowd was accused of corruption and of organising violence against Sinn Féin supporters during the North Leitrim by-election of 1908, and that he was himself beaten up and severely injured by Sinn Féin supporters on polling day in 1918.

As a local authority representative, O’Dowd was a member of the Irish Convention of 1917–18, which unsuccessfully attempted to reconcile North and South Ireland.

He published a volume of poems, Lays of South Sligo, and contributed poems to T. D. Sullivan’s Weekly News.

Publication
Lays of South Sligo: A Few Wild Flowers of National Poetry, Dublin, Gill, 1888;  2nd ed. 1889

Notes

References

James McConnel (2004) ‘ "Fenians at Westminster": The Edwardian Irish Parliamentary Party and the Legacy of the New Departure’, Irish Historical Studies, Vol. 34, No. 133, May, p. 44

External links

 A lengthy and detailed biography of John O’Dowd by Frank Mara (2001) which however does not cite any sources. This appears to have been taken verbatim from "Worthies of Sligo" by John McTernan (Revised Edition, Sligo, 1994).

1856 births
1937 deaths
Irish poets
Members of the Parliament of the United Kingdom for County Sligo constituencies (1801–1922)
Irish farmers
UK MPs 1895–1900
UK MPs 1900–1906
UK MPs 1906–1910
UK MPs 1910
UK MPs 1910–1918